Hans Busek (11 March 1916 – unknown) was an Austrian chess player, Austrian Chess Championship bronze medalist (1954, 1955).

Biography
In the 1950s and 1960s Hans Busek was one of the leading chess players in Austria. He twice in row won bronze medals in Austrian Chess Championship (1954, 1955).

Hans Busek played for Austria in the Chess Olympiads:
 In 1950, at second board in the 9th Chess Olympiad in Dubrovnik (+2, =6, -2),
 In 1956, at second reserve board in the 12th Chess Olympiad in Moscow (+1, =3, -1).

Hans Busek played for Austria in the European Team Chess Championship preliminaries:
 In 1957, at fifth board in the 1st European Team Chess Championship preliminaries (+1, =1, -2),
 In 1961, at sixth board in the 2nd European Team Chess Championship preliminaries (+2, =1, -2),
 In 1965, at second reserve in the 3rd European Team Chess Championship preliminaries (+0, =2, -2).

References

External links
 
 Hans Busek chess games at 365chess.com

1916 births
Year of death missing
Austrian chess players
Chess Olympiad competitors